Generals elections were held in Spain on 29 September 1971 where Spanish citizens elected 104 of the 564 members of the Cortes Españolas, the Spanish legislature.

Electoral procedure 

To be eligible to vote, citizens must be heads of families, married women, or widows. To be eligible to be a candidate, citizens must be born in a province they are running in, have resided in the province for at least seven years since the age of 14, be supported by 1,000 electors of 0.5 percent of the province's population, and be a member of the National Movement.

There were 230 candidates up for election to fill 104 seats to the Cortes Españolas. The remaining seats were appointed by the Spanish government.

Results

References 

1971 in Spain
General elections in Spain
September 1971 events